Charlie McGeoghegan (born 29 July 1974) is a Canadian former politician.

He was elected to the Legislative Assembly of Prince Edward Island in a by-election on 15 October 2007, following the resignation of Pat Binns. He represented the electoral district of Belfast-Murray River from 2007 to 2015 and is a member of the Liberal Party.

McGeoghegan was also the party's candidate in the general election on 28 May 2007.

Arm wrestling
After completing high school, he attended the Canadian Coast Guard College in Point Edward, Nova Scotia. Prior to entering elected politics, McGeoghegan was a fisherman and a competitive arm wrestler. McGeoghegan was the winner in the 198-pound division of the 2003 World Arm Wrestling Championship held in Ottawa.

Electoral record

References

Living people
People from Queens County, Prince Edward Island
Prince Edward Island Liberal Party MLAs
1974 births
21st-century Canadian politicians